Remi Abiola  (August 1953 – 28 July 2009) was a Nigerian film actress and spouse of the late Moshood Abiola, a Nigerian business magnate and politician.
She died of cancer in New York City on 28 July 2009. She was survived by two children: Abimbola Umardeen and Olajumoke Adetoun.

Career 
Abiola trained as an actress at the Fielding School for Dramatic Arts in England in the 1970s after she left the defunct Nigerian Airways as a flight attendant. When she came back to Nigeria, she auditioned for roles and took part in a TV series anchored by Bayo Awala and Tunde Oloyede, which aired on NTA Channel 10.

See also
 List of Nigerian film producers

References

1953 births
2009 deaths
Nigerian film producers
Yoruba actresses
Actresses in Yoruba cinema
20th-century Nigerian actresses
21st-century Nigerian actresses
Deaths from cancer in New York (state)
Remi
Deaths from cancer